"Galaxy" is a song by Australian recording artist Jessica Mauboy featuring Stan Walker. It was written by Richard Vission, Ferras Alqaisi, Brett McLaughlin, Dominique Calvillo, Chico Bennett and Brad Ackley. Production for the song was handled by Vission, Bennett, Ackley, Braddon Williams, Anthony Egizii and David Musumeci. "Galaxy" was released digitally on 28 October 2011, as the fifth single from Mauboy's second studio album Get 'Em Girls (2010). It peaked at number 13 on the ARIA Singles Chart and number seven on the ARIA Urban Singles Chart. "Galaxy" also became Mauboy's first charting release in New Zealand, where it reached number 36.

Background and release 
In May 2011, Walker revealed to Herald Sun that he and Mauboy recorded a duet that would be released later in the year. He explained, "It's the first time Australia has had two urban kind of R&B acts doing a duet together ... The song was written for us, but it's definitely our song. It's a beast, that's all I can say". "Galaxy" was written by Richard Vission, Ferras Alqaisi, Brett McLaughlin, Dominique Calvillo, Chico Bennett and Brad Ackley. Production for the song was handled by Vission, Bennett, Ackley, Braddon Williams, Anthony Egizii and David Musumeci. Mauboy posted a video on YouTube of herself discussing the song, saying "It is a very special song. I remember listening to it with Stan and we were just like 'oh my gosh this song is crazy' ... you know talking about [a] galaxy, talking about a relationship that ... there's no way that we can ever part and ... its just that ... one who you love type of song". "Galaxy" was released digitally on 28 October 2011. A digital extended play was released on 9 December 2011, which featured the album version of "Galaxy" and remixes of Mauboy's previous singles "Inescapable", "What Happened to Us" and "Running Back".

Reception 
"Galaxy" debuted at number 28 on the ARIA Singles Chart on 7 November 2011, and peaked at number 13 the following week. On 28 November 2011, the song debuted and peaked at number seven on the ARIA Urban Singles Chart. "Galaxy" was certified platinum by the Australian Recording Industry Association (ARIA), denoting sales of 70,000 copies. "Galaxy" debuted on the New Zealand Singles Chart at number 40 on 28 November 2011, and became Mauboy's first charting single in that country. It peaked at number 36 on 13 February 2012. At the 2011 IT List Awards, "Galaxy" was nominated for Single of 2011. In 2012, it won Single of the Year at the Deadly Awards and was nominated for Song of the Year at the ARIA Music Awards.

Promotion 
The music video was filmed in Clovelly, New South Wales and premiered online on 1 November 2011. The first half of the video shows Walker and Mauboy at the beach and the second half shows the pair in front of a black backdrop surrounded by flying objects. They are then seen back on the beach, where several shooting comets land in the ocean. Intercut scenes throughout the video show different planets from Outer space, and a shooting comet heading towards Planet Earth. Mauboy and Walker performed "Galaxy" on The X Factor Australia on 1 November 2011, and on Sunrise on 29 November 2011.

Track listing 
Digital download
 "Galaxy" featuring Stan Walker – 3:25

Digital EP
 "Galaxy" featuring Stan Walker (Album version) – 4:02
 "Inescapable" (Mix FM Up Close & Personal) – 3:57
 "What Happened to Us" featuring Stan Walker – 3:18
 "Running Back" (Mix FM Up Close & Personal) – 4:06

Credits and personnel 
Credits adapted from Get 'Em Girls (Deluxe Edition) liner notes.

Brad Ackley – songwriter, additional producer
Ferras Alqaisi – songwriter
Chico Bennett – producer, songwriter
Dominique Calvillo – songwriter
Tom Coyne – mastering
Anthony Egizii – vocal producer

Damien Lewis – additional/assistant engineer
Brett McLaughlin – songwriter 
Phil Tan – mixer
Richard Vission – producer, songwriter
Braddon Williams – vocal engineer, vocal producer
David Musumeci – vocal producer

Charts

Weekly charts

Year-end charts

Certifications

References 

2011 songs
2011 singles
Jessica Mauboy songs
Stan Walker songs
Male–female vocal duets
Songs written by Chico Bennett
Sony Music Australia singles
Songs written by Ferras
Songs written by Leland (musician)